The 1987 Southern Illinois Salukis football team was an American football team that represented Southern Illinois University (now known as Southern Illinois University Carbondale) in the Gateway Collegiate Athletic Conference (GCAC) during the 1987 NCAA Division I-AA football season.  Under third-year head coach Ray Dorr, the team compiled a 3–8 record (2–4 against conference opponents) and tied for fifth place in the conference. The team played its home games at McAndrew Stadium in Carbondale, Illinois.

Schedule

Roster

References

Southern Illinois
Southern Illinois Salukis football seasons
Southern Illinois Salukis football